Westchester is a village in Cook County, Illinois, United States. It is a western suburb of Chicago. The population was 16,892 at the 2020 census. The current Village President is Nick Steker, serving in the special role of acting president after the death of the previous president Frank Perry from cancer.

History
The area now known as Westchester was occupied by German farmers beginning in the mid-19th century. Samuel Insull purchased the land in 1924 with plans to develop it for residential use and create an English-style town.  As a result, the town's name and the majority of its street names are of English origin.

The Great Depression slowed development during the 1930s, although the population continued to grow. The town's suburban development was stimulated by its being the western terminal of Chicago's rapid transit line. The extension of the line was removed in 1951. But in 1956 the federal government began postwar construction of the Interstate Highway System, resulting in the construction of nearby expressways I-290 and I-294. These have provided residents with convenient travel in the region.

Residential and retail development has consumed nearly all open land within the village, save for the protected  of Wolf Road Prairie.  It is the largest black-soil prairie remnant east of the Mississippi River.

Geography
Westchester is located at  (41.853890, -87.883712).

It shares its western border with Du Page County.

Transportation
Residents of Westchester have a small variety of transportation options available to them. Cermak Road and Roosevelt Road are two major stroads that cut through the village. Residents also have bus service through Pace Bus Service, with routes 301, 317, and 330 serving the community. Route 317 follows the former extension to the CTA Blue Line before it was removed. There have been calls to restore Blue Line service to the community and plans have existed, however, CTA currently has no plans to extend the Blue Line from Forest Park. Westchester has a Walk Score of 43, meaning most errands require driving a car. The village also has several zoning provisions that foster car dependency, such as minimum parking requirements.

Demographics
As of the 2020 census there were 16,892 people, 6,811 households, and 4,385 families residing in the village. The racial makeup of the village was 55.95% White, 19.87% African American, 0.62% Native American, 4.13% Asian, 0.05% Pacific Islander, 8.30% from other races, and 11.09% from two or more races. Hispanic or Latino of any race were 21.02% of the population.

There were 6,811 households, out of which 30.99% had children under the age of 18 living with them, 51.92% were married couples living together, 9.41% had a female householder with no husband present, and 35.62% were non-families. 31.73% of all households were made up of individuals, and 18.81% had someone living alone who was 65 years of age or older. The average household size was 3.00 and the average family size was 2.36.

The village's age distribution consisted of 15.6% under the age of 18, 6.1% from 18 to 24, 21.5% from 25 to 44, 28.1% from 45 to 64, and 28.7% who were 65 years of age or older. The median age was 49.2 years. For every 100 females, there were 89.9 males. For every 100 females age 18 and over, there were 86.3 males.

The median income for a household in the village was $88,861, and the median income for a family was $108,067. Males had a median income of $57,055 versus $48,533 for females. The per capita income for the village was $43,868. About 2.3% of families and 3.7% of the population were below the poverty line, including 4.1% of those under age 18 and 4.0% of those age 65 or over.

Note: the US Census treats Hispanic/Latino as an ethnic category. This table excludes Latinos from the racial categories and assigns them to a separate category. Hispanics/Latinos can be of any race.

Government
Westchester is divided among three congressional districts. The areas south of Cermak Road or west of Haase and Burns avenues are in Illinois's 3rd congressional district; nearly all of the areas east of Mannheim Road and east of Mayfair Avenue, between Canterbury Street and Dorchester Avenue, are in the 7th district; and the area in between (primarily Oak Ridge and Glen Oak cemeteries) is in the state's 4th district.

Economy
Westchester is home to Westbrook Corporate Center, located at Wolf Road and Cermak Road. Constructed in 1986 and renovated in 1996, the complex consists of five 10-story towers encompassing more than 1 million square feet (90,000 m2) of office space. Westbrook Corporate Center has won the 2000/2001 BOMA- International Office Building of the Year Award, 2000/2001 BOMA- North Central Region Office Building of the Year Award, and 1998/1999, 1999/2000, 2000/2001 BOMA- Suburban Chicago Office Building of the Year Award.

Top employers
According to the Village's 2012 Comprehensive Annual Financial Report, the top employers in the city are:

Education

Public schools
Westchester School District 92.5 serves most of the city. There are four schools in this district:
 Westchester Primary School (Preschool – 2nd grade)
 Westchester Intermediate School (3rd grade – 5th grade)
 Westchester Middle School (6th grade – 8th grade)
 Britten School (Special Needs)

In addition Hillside School District 93, which operates a single K-8 school in Hillside, serves a section of Westchester. 
In 1968 the school district proposed a bond for a junior high school,  on a  parcel of land in Westchester. The voters rejected the referendum and the plans were scrapped. The president of Concord Homes, Roger Mankedick, stated in a Chicago Sun-Times stated that the student population that was supposed to surround the school never came. The Chicago Tribune stated there was a decline in students in the area surrounding the school site. In 1998 the district instead sold the land to Concord Homes for $2.6 million.

Proviso Township High Schools district serves high school residents. Zoned students attend Proviso West High School in Hillside. Westchester residents may apply to Proviso Math & Science Academy in Forest Park.

Private schools
The following private Catholic school of the Roman Catholic Archdiocese of Chicago is located in the village:
 Divine Providence School (PS–8)

Other private schools are located in the village:
Immanuel Christian Academy (K–8, Lutheran)
 Westchester Christian School (K-12, Non-Denominational)
PAEC Academy (K-8, Special Needs)

Recreation
The Village of Westchester is home to the Westchester Park District, which provides many recreational amenities and activities for both residents and non-residents. There are also five different golf courses available within 3 miles or a 10-minute drive from Westchester: The Chicago Highlands Club; located on the southwest side of the village, Fresh Meadow Golf Club in Hillside, Meadowlark Golf Course in Hinsdale, and The Oakbrook Golf Club and Butler National Golf Club in Oakbrook. Additionally, Westchester is home to Eden Lanes Bowling Alley, Focus Time Escape Rooms, the Wolf Road Prairie, the Westchester Woods Sledding Hill, 4 youth sports organizations, and multiple forest preserves.

Parks and playgrounds
Camberly Park
Community Park
Dury Lane Park
Gladstone Park
High Ridge Park
Mayfair Park
Middle School Athletic Fields
Norfolk Park
Primary School Park
Sweetbriar Park
 Forest the Fox's Playbox at the Mayfair Recreation Center

Fitness
Anytime Fitness
Westchester Community Center
Mayfair Recreation Center

Aquatics
John J. Sinde Community Swimming Pool serves as Westchester's public pool. The facility was dedicated with a ribbon-cutting event on June 5, 1977, and officially opened on June 11, 1977. The facility features a beautiful 50-meter pool with a 12-foot-deep diving well. Other enjoyable features are a separate zero-depth wading pool with bubblers. The main pool has a 25-foot-high, 150-foot-long water slide and an SCS interactive water play structure in the shallow end. A concession stand and grass area round out the facility. The facility is typically in operation from Memorial Day through Labor Day.
The Chicago Highlands Club also boasts an outdoor seasonal pool, however those wishing to use it must possess a membership to the club or be a guest of a current member.

Notable people

 Philip Caputo, author and journalist (A Rumor of War); born in Westchester
 Marco D'Amico, mafia member of the Chicago Outfit 
 Mario Anthony DeStefano, member of the Chicago Outfit
 Jim Durkin, state legislator representing Illinois' 82nd District
 Kathryn Hahn, actress (Crossing Jordan); born in Westchester
 Julian Love, NFL player (New York Giants)
Cameron Meredith, NFL player (New Orleans Saints)
 Gene Pingatore, basketball coach at St. Joseph High School; lived in Westchester
 Michael Sarno, member of the Chicago Outfit
Saba, rapper  and record producer
 Daniel P. Ward, Chief Justice of the Illinois Supreme Court; lived in Westchester

See also

References

External links
 Village of Westchester official website

Chicago metropolitan area
Populated places established in 1926
Villages in Cook County, Illinois
Villages in Illinois
1926 establishments in Illinois